Janet Radünzel (born 7 May 1973 in Rendsburg) is a former German rower.  She represented Germany at international competitions.

At the 1995 World Rowing Championships she won the bronze medal in the LW4- event, together with Jutta Schausten, Gunda Reimers and Gaby Schulz.

References 
 

1973 births
Living people
German female rowers
People from Rendsburg
World Rowing Championships medalists for Germany
Sportspeople from Schleswig-Holstein
20th-century German women
21st-century German women